Paul Gross (born 1959) is a Canadian actor, producer, director, singer and writer.

Paul Gross may also refer to:
Paul Magnus Gross (1895–1986), American chemist and educator
Paul P. Gross, American television meteorologist
Paul R. Gross, American biologist and author